The Northwest Athletic Conference (NWAC), formerly the Northwest Athletic Association of Community Colleges (NWAACC), is a sports association for community colleges in the U.S. states of Oregon, Washington and Idaho, along with the Canadian province of British Columbia.

The NWAC ("En-Wack") was originally formed in 1946 as the Washington State Junior College Athletic Conference (WSJCAC). In 1961, the state Legislature removed a legal roadblock that had barred the establishment of junior colleges in counties with four-year colleges. After the Legislature took action, the number of schools in the WAACC nearly doubled. Three years later, the conference was renamed the Washington Athletic Association of Community Colleges (WAACC).

In 1970 the conference admitted its first non-Washington member, Mt. Hood Community College of Gresham, Oregon, which had left the Oregon Community College Athletic Association (OCCAA). At that time, the WAACC became the Northwest AACC, reflecting its two-state membership.

The NWAACC merged with its Oregon counterpart in 1983, resulting in a 26-member circuit stretching from southwestern Oregon to the Canada–US border.

On July 1, 2014, the conference announced that they were becoming the Northwest Athletic Conference.

The NWAC, now with 36 members, is the largest community college conference in the United States. It is not affiliated with the National Junior College Athletic Association (NJCAA), but acknowledges on the NWAC website athletes representing conference schools in the NJCAA wrestling tournament.

Charter members of the WSJCAC
Centralia College – Centralia, Washington
Clark College – Vancouver, Washington 
Everett Community College – Everett, Washington 
Grays Harbor College – Aberdeen, Washington 
Lower Columbia College – Longview, Washington
Skagit Valley College – Mount Vernon, Washington
Olympic College – Bremerton, Washington 
Wenatchee Valley College – Wenatchee, Washington
Yakima Valley Community College – Yakima, Washington

Members by region

Northern Region
Bellevue College – Bellevue, Washington
Douglas College – New Westminster, British Columbia, Canada
Edmonds College – Lynnwood, Washington
Everett Community College – Everett, Washington 
Olympic College – Bremerton, Washington
Peninsula College – Port Angeles, Washington
Shoreline Community College – Shoreline, Washington
Skagit Valley College – Mount Vernon, Washington
Whatcom Community College – Bellingham, Washington

Southern Region
Chemeketa Community College – Salem, Oregon
Clackamas Community College – Oregon City, Oregon
Lane Community College – Eugene, Oregon
Linn-Benton Community College – Albany, Oregon
Mt. Hood Community College – Gresham, Oregon
Portland Community College – Portland, Oregon
Rogue Community College – Grants Pass, Oregon
Southwestern Oregon Community College – Coos Bay, Oregon
Umpqua Community College – Roseburg, Oregon

Eastern Region
Big Bend Community College – Moses Lake, Washington
Blue Mountain Community College – Pendleton, Oregon
Columbia Basin College – Pasco, Washington 
North Idaho College – Coeur d'Alene, Idaho 
Community Colleges of Spokane – Spokane, Washington 
Treasure Valley Community College – Ontario, Oregon
Walla Walla Community College – Walla Walla, Washington
Wenatchee Valley College – Wenatchee, Washington
Yakima Valley College – Yakima, Washington

Western Region
Centralia College – Centralia, Washington
Clark College – Vancouver, Washington
Grays Harbor College – Aberdeen, Washington
Green River College – Auburn, Washington
Highline College – Des Moines, Washington
Lower Columbia College – Longview, Washington
Pierce College – Lakewood, Washington
South Puget Sound Community College – Olympia, Washington
Tacoma Community College – Tacoma, Washington

History and growth 
1946: WSJCAC is Born
Although athletic competition between junior colleges existed in the 1930s, the first structured league and championship events in men's sports came in 1946 when the Washington State Junior College Athletic Conference (WSJCAC) was formed. Following the nine charter members, Columbia Basin College joined in 1955.

Initially, the conference offered football, basketball, baseball, tennis, track and golf. In 1963 wrestling was added, followed by cross country in 1965 and soccer in 1974.

The WSJCAC existed without bylaws until the spring of 1948, when Executive Secretary Jim Ennis of Everett JC, Dave DuVall of Skagit Valley and Maury Phipps of Grays Harbor, wrote the conference's original constitution. The document set forth the overall philosophy of the conference's athletic program, and prescribed scholarship limits and grade eligibility requirements.

1963: Birth of Oregon's Conference
In 1963, five Oregon schools joined to form the Oregon Community College Athletic Association (OCCAA). Charter members were Blue Mountain, Central Oregon, Clatsop, Southwestern Oregon and Treasure Valley community colleges. The conference more than doubled in size in the 1968-69 school year, when Chemeketa, Clackamas, Lane, Linn-Benton, Mt. Hood, Portland and Umpqua community colleges joined the circuit.

1970s: The NWAACC and the Rise of Women's Athletics
During the 1970s, the newly renamed NWAACC saw the growth of women's sports at its member institutions. Women's athletics were governed by the Northwest College Women's Sports Association (NCWSA) until 1978, when the NCWSA was absorbed by the NWAACC.

Volunteer athletic directors had overseen conference functions and activities until the addition of women's athletics. The subsequent increased workload caused the NWAACC to convene a five-member hiring committee, which in 1979 appointed Frank Bosone as the conference's first executive director. Bosone retired in 1992 and was succeeded by Dick McClain, a longtime baseball coach in Corvallis, Oregon.

1983: Merger
Community college athletics in the Pacific Northwest changed dramatically in 1983, when seven OCCAA members joined the NWAACC. The merger between the Washington and Oregon colleges has helped the NWAACC become a strong organization. Since 1984, nine other colleges have added intercollegiate athletics and/or became NWAACC members.

Today:
The NWAACC was renamed the Northwest Athletic Conference on July 1, 2014  and has 36 member schools.

Sports 
The NWAC sponsors intercollegiate athletic competition in the following sports:

References

External links 
NWAC Homepage
NWAC TV

Northwest Athletic Association of Community Colleges
1946 establishments in Washington (state)